The UEFA Super Cup (called European Super Cup prior to 1995) is an annual contest played between the previous season's UEFA Champions League (formerly the European Cup) and UEFA Europa League (formerly UEFA Cup) winners. The first final, played over two legs between Dutch team Ajax and Glasgow's Rangers is considered unofficial by UEFA. Rangers were banned from European competition due to the behaviour of their fans but, having won the UEFA Cup Winners' Cup the previous season, contested the title. Ajax lifted the trophy under the guidance of Romanian manager Ștefan Kovács, winning 6–3 over the two legs.

From 1973 to 1999, the Super Cup was contested by the winners of the European Cup/Champions League and the holders of the UEFA Cup Winners' Cup. The latter competition was then abolished and since then, the UEFA Cup have taken part in their place, Galatasaray being the first UEFA Cup winners to do so in 2000. Since the 1998 competition, the final has been a single match, played at a neutral venue (formerly the Stade Louis II in Monaco but now alternating every year). The first final held in the principality ended in success for Chelsea, led by Italian Gianluca Vialli.

Italian managers have fared most successfully since the inception of the contest, winning twelve titles. Carlo Ancelotti is the only manager to have won the trophy on four occasions, winning it with Milan in 2003 and 2007 and Real Madrid in 2014 and 2022.

By year

Managers with multiple titles

By nationality 
This table lists the total number of titles won by managers of each nationality.

References

General

Specific

Notes

External links 
 UEFA Super Cup official history

Managers
Uefa Super Cup